Raykhona Kodirova is an Uzbek  boxer. She represented Uzbekistan at the 2020 Summer Olympics in Tokyo.

References

External links
 

1993 births
Living people
Sportspeople from Tashkent
Olympic boxers of Uzbekistan
Boxers at the 2020 Summer Olympics
Uzbekistani women boxers
20th-century Uzbekistani women
21st-century Uzbekistani women